Constantin Teodorescu was one of the generals of the Romanian Army in the First World War. He is most known for serving as division commander in the 1916 campaign.

Military career
Constantin Teodorescu attended the classes of the School of Non-Commissioned Officers in Bucharest between 1881 and 1883, after graduating from which he was admitted to take the graduation exam of the Military School of Infantry and Cavalry, which he passed in 1883 with the rank of lieutenant. Subsequently, Teodorescu held various positions in the infantry units or in the upper echelons of the army, the most important being those of Deputy Chief of Staff of the Second Army Corps, commander of the IV Ilfov Regiment no. 21, senior director of the Personnel Directorate of the Ministry of War or head of the Mobilization Section of the General Staff.

During World War I he served as commander of the 17th Infantry Division, between August 14 and August 24, 1916. The 17th Division was tasked with defending the head of the Turtucaia bridge.

Due to the faulty way of exercising the act of command by the superior military leadership of the army (head of the General Headquarters, commander of the 3rd Army, commanders of the 17th, 9th and 19th Infantry Divisions), after only five days of fighting, Bulgarian-German troops win at the Battle of Turtucaia. General Radu R. Rosetti identified as one of the main causes of losing the battle the lack of any qualities of General Teodorescu. He was relieved of the command of the division on August 24, 1916, later performing secondary functions such as that of commander of the Territorial Command of the 6th Infantry Division.

Works
Military geography course of Romania and neighboring countries by Colonel Teodorescu C., Professor of military geography at the Răsboiu High School and at the Special Infantry School. *With an introduction by Mr. General Ionescu, G., Director of the Geographical Service of the Army. Vol. I. General information on Europe, Russia, Austria-Hungary and the Balkan Peninsula. The theaters of operations of: Bessarabia, Galicia, Bukovina, Transylvania, Bulgaria, and Serbia. With 28 sketches in the text. Bucharest (Albert Baer), 1912
Military geography course of Romania and neighboring countries by Colonel Teodorescu C., Professor of military geography at the Răsboiu High School and at the Special Infantry School. With an introduction by Mr. General Ionescu, G., Director of the Geographical Service of the Army. Vol II. Romania. Work approved and recommended to troops and military schools by order of the Ministry of War (General Staff) No. 11395 of March 15, 1912. With 35 sketches, 2 colored plans and 4 views in the text. Bucharest (Carol Gobl Institute of Graphic Arts Sister Ion St. Rasidescu), 1912
Military geography [by] Colonel Teodorescu C. Ed. II. Revised and added based on the latest alterations to the Balkans from 1912 to 1913. With numerous sketches and plans. Paper approved by order of the Ministry of War (General Staff), No. 11395 of March 15, 1912. Bucharest (Albert Baer), 1914
The first excursion of military tourists to Brăila-Măcin by Major C. Teodorescu, from the General Staff of the Second Army Corps. Bucharest (Institute of Graphic Arts Carol Gobl Sr I. St. Rasidescu), 1904
Answer to an article in the Army Magazine by Colonel C. Teodorescu. Bucharest (Institute of Graphic Arts Carol Gobl Sister I. St. Rasidescu), 1912
Reorganization of the Romanian army. Conference held at the Military Circle in Bucharest on March 30, 1905, in the presence of His Majesty the King and officers of all weapons in the Bucharest garrison by Major C. Teodorescu, Deputy Chief of Staff of the Second Army Corps, Patented by the General Staff. Bucharest (Carol Gobl Institute of Graphic Arts Sister Ion St. Rasidescu), 1905.

References

Bibliography
Kirițescu, Constantin, History of the war for the unification of Romania, Scientific and Encyclopedic Publishing House, Bucharest, 1989
Ioanițiu, Alexandru, The Romanian War: 1916–1918, vol. 1, Genius Printing House, Bucharest, 1929
 Romania in the World War 1916–1919, Documents, Annexes, Volume 1, Official Gazette and State Printing, Bucharest, 1934
 The General Headquarters of the Romanian Army. Documents 1916–1920, Machiavelli Publishing House, Bucharest, 1996
 Military History of the Romanian People, vol. V, Military Publishing House, Bucharest, 1989
 Romania during the First World War, Military Publishing House, Bucharest, 1987
 Romania in the First World War, Military Publishing House, 1979

 

1863 births
1941 deaths
Romanian Land Forces generals
Romanian Army World War I generals
Officers of the Order of the Star of Romania
Romanian military personnel of the Second Balkan War
Officers of the Order of the Crown (Romania)